Michael McLean (born 6 March 1963) is an English professional golfer.

McLean was born in Farnborough, Kent. He turned professional in 1981 and played on the European Tour through most of the 1980s and 1990s. He made the top one hundred on the European Tour Order of Merit ten times with a best ranking of 20th in 1991. His sole European Tour win came at the 1990 Portuguese Open TPC.

Professional wins (4)

European Tour wins (1)

Other wins (3)
1983 Cacharel World Under-25 Championship
1994 Mauritius Open
2000 Mauritius Open

Results in major championships

Note: McLean only played in The Open Championship.

CUT = missed the half-way cut
"T" = tied

Team appearances
Amateur
Jacques Léglise Trophy (representing Great Britain & Ireland): 1980 (winners)

References

External links

English male golfers
European Tour golfers
European Senior Tour golfers
People from Farnborough, London
Golfers from London
1963 births
Living people